The CAA Theatre, formerly the Panasonic Theatre, is a theatre located at 651 Yonge Street in Toronto, Ontario, Canada. It is operated by Mirvish Productions. On December 1, 2017, Mirvish Productions announced a marketing partnership with CAA South Central Ontario, which included renaming the venue that was known as the Panasonic Theatre. 

In February 2023, the Toronto Star reported that Mirvish sold the property in 2015, and that the current owner, private equity firm KingSett Capital, was planning to redevelop the site as a high-rise mixed-use building.

History

Early years
The original Second Empire building was built in 1911 as a private residence, then gutted and converted to a movie theatre in 1919 and known as The Victory. It was renamed The Embassy in 1934 and known by a number of other names over the next sixty years, including the Astor, the Showcase, and the Festival.

In the 1970s, the Festival Theatre was a key venue of the Toronto International Film Festival (then known as the Festival of Festivals).

Conversion to live theatre
In 1993, the building was renovated for live theatre productions and renamed The New Yorker Theatre.

Demolition and reconstruction
In 2004 and 2005, most of the building was demolished, with only the facade preserved. The old building was replaced by a new state-of-the-art live theatre and concert venue, known as The Panasonic Theatre. In 2005, the building was acquired by Live Nation and in 2008 by Mirvish Productions.

Site redevelopment
In February 2023, the Toronto Star reported that Mirvish sold the property in 2015, citing property records. City records also indicate the current owner, private equity firm KingSett Capital, has applied to the city to redevelop the site as a 76-storey, mixed-use building, retaining only the façade of the CAA Theatre building.

Notable productions
Productions are listed by the year of their first performance.

Panasonic Theatre 
2008:  We Will Rock You
2009: My Mother's Lesbian Jewish Wiccan Wedding,  Cloud 9
2010: My Mother's Lesbian Jewish Wiccan Wedding
2011:  Ghost Stories, Two Pianos Four Hands
2012: Potted Potter, Bloodless,  Without You
2013: Clybourne Park, Mary Walsh's Dancing with Rage,  Cats, God of Carnage, The Musical of Musicals (The Musical!)
2014: Arrabal, Dead Metaphor,  The Boy With Tape On His Face, Buyer & Cellar
2015:  Boom, Vanya and Sonia and Masha and Spike,  Seminar
2016: Bigmouth, Disgraced, Fight Night, Potted Potter
2017: My Night with Reg, Butcher, An Evening with  Stephen Schwartz, Salt-Water Moon

CAA Theatre 
2017:  Million Dollar Quartet 
2018:  King Charles III ,  Fun Home, Potted Potter
2019:  Oslo, A Doll's House, Part 2, Next to Normal, Piaf/Dietrich
2020: Us/Them
2022:  Indecent
2023: Things I Know to Be True

References

External links
 

Theatres in Toronto
Cinemas and movie theatres in Ontario
Former cinemas in Canada
Movie palaces
Mirvish family